WDEB-FM (103.9 FM, "Great American Country") is a radio station broadcasting a country music format. Licensed to Jamestown, Tennessee, United States, the station is currently owned by Baz Broadcasting, Inc. and features programming from Citadel Media. The station has obtained a construction permit from the FCC for a power increase to 3,400 watts.

History
The station was opened up in 1975 by N.A. "Turk" Baz. It was assigned the call sign WDEB on April 2, 1979. On July 18, 1979, the station changed its call sign to the current WDEB-FM.

References

External links

DEB-FM
Country radio stations in the United States